Shimshit is a secular community settlement in northern Israel. Located to the north-west of Nazareth, it falls under the jurisdiction of Jezreel Valley Regional Council.

History
The village was established in the summer of 2000. The architect and entrepreneur of the village, as part of the Galilee Progress, was Architect Zvi (Tzibi) Springer who took over the tasks of planning, and managing the construction of the village after the Housing Ministry abandoned the project. Shimshit was named after the nearby archaeological tell.

Shimshit was designed based on the principles of sustainability and minimal intervention with nature.

References

External links
Village website 

Community settlements
Populated places established in 2000
Populated places in Northern District (Israel)
2000 establishments in Israel